Acteon dancei is a species of sea snail, a marine gastropod mollusk in the family Acteonidae.

Original Description
   Poppe G.T., Tagaro S.P. & Stahlschmidt P. (2015). New shelled molluscan species from the central Philippines I. Visaya. 4(3): 15-59. page(s): 32, pl. 13 figs 1-2.

References

 
Gastropods described in 2015